Samantha Edwards (born 14 January 1990) is an Antigua and Barbuda sprinter. She competed at the 2014 and 2016 IAAF World Indoor Championships.

She was born in the United States and initially represented that country, but after failing to qualify for the 2012 Summer Olympics she decided to switch her allegiance to the Antigua and Barbuda, her grandfather's country of origin.

Her personal bests in the event are 52.15 seconds outdoors (Petersburg 2012) and 53.01 seconds indoors (Boston 2016).

Competition record

References

1990 births
Living people
Antigua and Barbuda female sprinters
People from Elmont, New York
Track and field athletes from New York (state)
Athletes (track and field) at the 2014 Commonwealth Games
Commonwealth Games competitors for Antigua and Barbuda
American people of Antigua and Barbuda descent
American emigrants to Antigua and Barbuda